Juan Manuel "Juanma" López Iturriaga (born February 4, 1959) is a Spanish retired professional basketball player. He played shooting guard and small forward and appeared in a total of 90 games with the Spain national basketball team, winning a silver medal at the 1984 Olympics in Los Angeles.

Career
In 1975–76, Iturriaga played for Loyola Indautxu in national competition. Then he joined Real Madrid Baloncesto, where he would stay until the year 1987–88.

Retirement
Juan Manuel López Iturriaga has become a sports consultant on Spanish TV channels, commenting on the games of the Spanish team, working in newspapers such as El País and Gigantes del Basket. After his playing career, he began a career as a television host on Telemadrid, ETB 2, Telecinco and La Sexta,

References

Fibaeurope.com profile
 Spanish Olympic Committee

External links
 ACB profile

1959 births
Living people
Basketball players at the 1980 Summer Olympics
Basketball players at the 1984 Summer Olympics
Liga ACB players
Medalists at the 1984 Summer Olympics
Olympic basketball players of Spain
Olympic medalists in basketball
Olympic silver medalists for Spain
Real Madrid Baloncesto players
Shooting guards
Small forwards
Spanish men's basketball players
1982 FIBA World Championship players
Sportspeople from Bilbao
Basketball players from the Basque Country (autonomous community)